DVB-S2X is an extension of DVB-S2 satellite digital broadcasting standard.

DVB-S2X is a digital satellite television broadcast standard. It has been standardized  by DVB Project in March 2014 as an optional extension of DVB-S2 standard. It will also become an ETSI standard.

Main features  
Compared to DVB-S2, efficiency gains up to 51% can be achieved with DVB-S2X.

Amongst improvements are: 
Higher order modulation schemes (64/128/256APSK)
Smaller roll-off factors of 5%, 10% and 15%
Improved filtering making it possible to have smaller carrier spacing
Channel bonding in order to combine several different carriers increasing efficiency in DTH applications

Channel bonding helps, particularly for UHDTV services.  Statistical multiplexing is often used to allow more television services to fit into a single satellite channel.  Statistical multiplexing works best when there are many television channels which can share their bandwidth.  With UHDTV services, it may only be possible to fit 3 services in a single satellite channel which reduces the effectiveness of statistical multiplexing.  Bonding channels increases the number UHDTV services within the bonded channel allowing the statistical multiplexing to work more efficiently.

Because of a lack of backwards compatibility with existing DVB-S2 decoders, Belgian company Newtec has developed the 'DVB-S2plus/Extensions' technology, which tries to reconcile the benefits of the DVB-S2X with compatibility to existing systems.

Use cases 

In particular for DTH, a possible use case is the launch of UHDTV-1 (e.g., 4k) television services in Ku-/Ka-band that will adopt HEVC encoding. (ref,p7)

See also
DVB-S
DVB-S2

References

Digital Video Broadcasting (DVB); Second generation framing structure, channel coding and modulation systems for Broadcasting, Interactive Services, News Gathering and other broadband satellite applications Part II: S2 - Extensions (DVB-S2X)

Digital Video Broadcasting
Satellite broadcasting
Television transmission standards